Frog and Toad All Year is an American picture book written and illustrated by Arnold Lobel, published by Harper & Row in 1976. It is the third book in the Frog and Toad series, whose four books completed by Lobel each comprises five easy-to-read short stories.

Characters 
The two friends, Frog and Toad, are portrayed by the author with human-like personalities and amphibian appearance. The situations in which they find themselves are a cross between the human and animal worlds. Along with Lobel's other Frog and Toad books, Frog and Toad All Year is valued by experts in children's literature for its portrayal of the value of friendship.

Summary 

Friends Frog and Toad, who have quite different personalities, have adventures through the seasons...

Down the Hill 
Frog invites Toad to go sledding with him, on a trip that doesn't go as planned.

The Corner 
Frog recalls how he searched for Spring around various corners when he was very young.

Ice Cream 
Toad finds himself in a sticky situation when he buys ice cream cones for himself and Frog.

The Surprise 
Frog and Toad secretly sneak out to rake the other's leaves.

Christmas Eve 
Toad becomes concerned when Frog is late for their Christmas celebration.

Adaptations 
The book has been adapted as a musical, written by Willie and Robert Reale and entitled A Year with Frog and Toad, opened on Broadway, and was also performed by the Second Story Repertory, by Children's Theatre Company in Minneapolis, and by the Chicago Children's Theatre, among others. The stories have also been produced as an audio book.

Reception 
Frog and Toad All Year won a Christopher Award in 1977. It is listed in the New York Times Parent's Guide to the Best Books for Children.

Kirkus Reviews wrote, "We miss some of the resonant psychological heft of this pair's previous experiences, but Frog and Toad can still transform the most ordinary seasonal activities into celebrations."

References

External links

 

1976 children's books
American picture books
Books about frogs
Children's books about friendship
Picture books by Arnold Lobel
Harper & Row books